Aaba  is a village in the Koura District of Lebanon, whose inhabitants are Greek Orthodox and other confessions.  It is located 240 metres above sea level and has an area of 0.16 square kilometers.

References

External links
Aaba Facebook Group

Eastern Orthodox Christian communities in Lebanon
Populated places in the North Governorate
Koura District